Timbellus vespertilio, common name : the butterfly murex, is a species of sea snail, a marine gastropod mollusk in the family Muricidae, the murex snails or rock snails.

Description
The size of an adult shell varies between 17 mm and 50 mm.

Distribution
This marine species is found in the Pacific Ocean along Southeast Japan and the Philippines.

References

 Merle D., Garrigues B. & Pointier J.-P. (2011) Fossil and Recent Muricidae of the world. Part Muricinae. Hackenheim: Conchbooks. 648 pp. page(s): 133

External links
 Gastropods.com : Pterynotus (Pterynotus) vespertilio; accessed : 13 April 2011

Muricidae
Gastropods described in 1959